African Covenant (ACO) is a conservative religious South African political party formed in 2018 by Convy Baloyi.

The party is proposing the return of the death penalty for murder and abortion, and wishes to overturn the legalisation of same-sex marriage in South Africa, describing marriage as an institution uniting "one man and one woman".

Baloyi stated that with supernatural aid African Covenant would be the ruling party after the 2019 general election.

The party failed to win a seat.

National elections 

|-
! Election
! Total votes
! Share of vote
! Seats 
! +/–
! Government
|-
! 2019
| 7,019
| 0.04%
| 
| –
| 
|}

Provincial elections 

! rowspan=2 | Election
! colspan=2 | Eastern Cape
! colspan=2 | Free State
! colspan=2 | Gauteng
! colspan=2 | Kwazulu-Natal
! colspan=2 | Limpopo
! colspan=2 | Mpumalanga
! colspan=2 | North-West
! colspan=2 | Northern Cape
! colspan=2 | Western Cape
|-
! % !! Seats
! % !! Seats
! % !! Seats
! % !! Seats
! % !! Seats
! % !! Seats
! % !! Seats
! % !! Seats
! % !! Seats
|-
! 2019
| 0.03% || 0/63
| 0.04% || 0/30
| 0.06% || 0/73
| 0.03% || 0/80
| 0.05% || 0/49
| 0.04% || 0/30
| 0.05% || 0/33
| 0.05% || 0/30
| 0.05% || 0/42
|}

References

2018 establishments in South Africa
Christian political parties in South Africa
Conservative parties in South Africa
Political parties established in 2018
Political parties in South Africa
Social conservative parties